, literally "Sankei Children's Publishing Culture Award", is a major and the oldest children's literary awards in Japan.

The Sankei Children's Book Award annually recognizes the preceding year's "most distinguished Japanese Children's literature, picture book for children", beginning with 1954 publications.

The Awards is selected from among all the children's books published in Japan of the previous year. The Awards are announced on  Children's Day on May 5 every year. The award ceremony are held at the end of May or early June, and "Kiko, Princess Akishino" attends the ceremony.

Recipients

Grand Prize - Newly established in 1961

Shōwa period

The 8th (1961) - (World Children's Literature Complete Works Volume 1) - (Supervisor : Yoshishige Abe) published by Kodansha

The 9th (1962) - * No corresponding work

The 10th (1963) - (Children's Friend) - published by Fukuinkan Shoten

The 11th (1964) - (Science illustration series - all 12 volumes) - published by Shogakukan

The 12th (1965) - (Andersen's Fairytales Complete Works - All 8 Volumes) - (Author: Andersen) published by Kodansha

The 13th (1966) - (Japanese insects for Boys and girls - All 5 volumes) - (Author : Mutsuo Kato-biologists) published by Maki Shoten

The 14th (1967) - (Jun'ichi Yoda's Complete Works - All 5 volumes) - (Author : Jun'ichi Yoda)  published by Dainippon Tosho

The 15th (1968) -  (Shozo Chiba's Fairytales Complete Works, Volume 1) - (Author : Shozo Chiba - literature writer) published by Iwasaki Shoten

The 16th (1969) - * No corresponding work

The 17th (1970) -  (Kappa (folklore) and Dark sleeper - (author: Tsubota Joji) published by Kodansha

The 18th (1971) -  (Light of mind, The Passion for Archeology) - (Author : Eiichi Fujimori - Archaeologist :  published by Chikuma Shobo

The 19th (1972) -  (Goro who keeps demons) - (Author : Yao Kitabatake) - published by Jitsugyo no Nihon Sha

The 20th (1973) -  (In the immediate side of the mountain Kachi-kachi Yama(Fire-Crackle Mountain)) - (author : Keisuke Tsutsui / picture : Yasuo Segawa ) published by froebel kan

The 21st (1974) -  (The fox came back) - (author : Eriko Kishida / illustrator : Chiyoko Nakatani ) published by Kodansha

The 22nd (1975) -  (Sea and boy) - (author : Kazuo Yamamoto / illustrator : Yoshiharu Suzuki ) published by Rironsha

The 23rd (1976) -  (Albums of Science -, all 50 volumes and 2 Separate volumes) - published by Akane Shobo

The 24th (1977) -  (Island with Dragon)- (author : Yoichi Takashi / illustrator : Daihachi Ota ) published by Alice Kan

The 25th (1978) -  (Chinese Classical Literature - all 14 Volume) - published by Saela Shobo

The 26th (1979) -  (Attelabidae) (Insects) (author & photo : Yasunosuke Chikuni) - published by kaiseisha

The 27th (1980) -  * No corresponding work

The 28th (1981) -  (Beyond the Golden Empire) - (author : Keiko Yanagiya / illustrator : Takaya Ono ) published by Obunsha

The 29th (1982) -  (Great Thief Mr.wander)) - (author : Eiko Kadono / illustrator : Akira Odagiri ) published by Kodansha

The 30th (1983) -  (the picturebook for mathematics for the first time - All 3 volumes)- (author : Mitsumasa Anno ) published by Fukuinkan Shoten

The 31st (1984) - * No  corresponding work

The 32nd (1985) -  (Poems of Children of Japan - all 47 Volumes) - published by Iwasaki Shoten

The 33rd (1986) -  ("Chikuma Boys Library - All 100 Volumes) - published by Chikuma Shobo

The 34th (1987) -  (Ryo-chan & Sato-chan's Tales - all 5 volumews) - (author : Masako Matsuno ) published by Dainippon Tosho

The 35th (1988) -  (Research of Plants climbing Mt. Fuji of plants) - (author & photo : Kiyoshi Shimizu ) published by Akane Shobo

See also
 Praemium Imperiale - an international art prize
 Kiko, Princess Akishino - the imperial family of Japan
 Akemi Chan Fund - is a Japan-based Medical Fund for the poor children suffering heart troubles.
 Sankei Shimbun - daily newspaper in Japan
 Fujisankei Communications Group -  Sankei Shimbun and Fuji Television, the largest media conglomerate in Japan
 Japan Railways Group - Former Japanese National Railways

References

Fujisankei Communications Group
Japanese children's writers
Children's literary awards
Awards established in 1954